Harry Van Landeghem (born 16 June 1949) is a Belgian wrestler. He competed in the men's Greco-Roman 62 kg at the 1972 Summer Olympics.

References

External links
 

1949 births
Living people
Belgian male sport wrestlers
Olympic wrestlers of Belgium
Wrestlers at the 1972 Summer Olympics
Sportspeople from East Flanders
People from Kruibeke